Christopher Wallace (born August 20, 1985), better known professionally as Don Trip, is an American rapper. As a pioneer of the Memphis sound, he's put out a consistent stream of mixtapes, albums, and projects since the mid-2000s.

Introduction 
Don Trip first started to break out in 2011, with the re-release of his song "Letter to my Son" featuring Cee Lo Green. This eventually led to his signing to Interscope in 2012, and being named an XXL Freshman later that year. After being dropped from the label, he managed to find further success as an independent artist with his critically acclaimed series of mixtapes titled Step Brothers, in collaboration with fellow Tennessee rapper Starlito.

Early life 
As a child, Don Trip grew up in the low-income East Memphis. Living in a fatherless household, Trip watched as his mother work three jobs, and still struggled to support him along with his brother and sister. At the age of 12, he began working to provide for his siblings, saying that "all we ever had was us." Even at an early age, though, Don Trip was inspired by Jay-Z and Tupac, and even studied Jadakiss verses with an almost religious fervor. At 15, he noticed his family was falling apart, and felt the urge to do something more to help them. Inspired by the pre-teen duo of Kriss Kross, he began rapping and making music.

Career

Early Career - 2012 

Don Trip's career began at 15, when he started rapping. After working on his craft, he began to release mixtapes and singles in very late 2000s, leading to a string of 9 projects being released between October 2010 (Crossface Crippler) and February 2012 (Guerilla). Releasing his mixtapes on websites such as Datpiff and HotNewHipHop, Don Trip began to amass a following as a street rapper. However, his song "Letter to My Son," (originally released in 2009) went semi-viral on YouTube, fueling his transition toward mainstream hip-hop. The song, which detailed Trip's struggle with being unable to see his son due to  court ruling, was lauded for its accurate depiction of a hardship not often portrayed in rap music. In 2012, hot on the heels of "Letter to My Son," Don Trip was named one of XXL's 2012 freshmen, alongside Future, Danny Brown, Hopsin, and more. Soon after, he was signed to Epidemic Records, a joint enterprise between production duo Cool & Dre and Interscope Records.

Step Brothers - Present 

Prior to his signing at Interscope, Don Trip scored big with his collaborative Step Brothers mixtape with Starlito. Released in 2011, the mixtape was peppered with references and in-jokes relating to the Judd Apatow movie Step Brothers, and gained a cult following among the rap community. A few months before the mixtape's release, Starlito and Don Trip were introduced to each other by Yo Gotti, with whom Don Trip was touring. Both rappers were already familiar with the other's music, and after discovering their musical compatibility, decided to make a joint project. Three studio sessions later, Step Brothers was fully recorded. Due to the success of the mixtape as well as their collaborative chemistry, Starlito and Don Trip continued to collaborate, releasing the Step Brothers 2 mixtape in 2013. While Don Trip was based in Memphis while Starlito was based in Nashville, the two continued to meet up to record, never emailing each other songs back and forth. Eventually, in 2017, the two linked up again for the third installment of the Step Brothers series, preceded by the Karate in the Garage collaborative mixtape. Released independently, like the two previous mixtapes, Step Brothers 3 received widespread critical acclaim from publications such as Pitchfork, XXL, and USA Today.

Personal life 
As of July 2017, Don Trip has four children, one son and three daughters, by three different women.

In May 2022, he shared wedding photos on his Instagram account.

Discography

Albums

Mixtapes

References 

Living people
American male rappers
Musicians from Memphis, Tennessee
People from Memphis, Tennessee
Rappers from Tennessee
Southern hip hop musicians
21st-century American rappers
21st-century American male musicians
1985 births
African-American male rappers
21st-century African-American musicians
20th-century African-American people